Lynnwood is a city in the Seattle metropolitan area.

Lynnwood may also refer to:

Places

Canada
 Lynnwood, Edmonton, Alberta

Scotland 

 Lynnwood, an area of Hawick, Scottish Borders

South Africa
 Lynnwood, Pretoria, a suburb

United States
 Lynnwood (Wakefield, Massachusetts), a historic house
 Lynnwood, Pennsylvania (disambiguation), several places
 Lynnwood, Virginia (disambiguation), several places

People 

 Lynnwood Farnam (1885–1930), Canadian organist

See also
 Linwood (disambiguation)
 Linnwood (disambiguation)
 Lynwood (disambiguation)

pt:Lynnwood